National Airways Cameroon, or Nacam, was an airline based in Yaoundé, Cameroon. It operated domestic scheduled services. It was established in November 1999 and started operations on 21 February 2000. However, operations were ceased in 2009.

Fleet

The National Airways Cameroon fleet included the following aircraft (as of 29 September 2008) :

2 Boeing 737-200

References

External links

National Airways Cameroon

Defunct airlines of Cameroon
Airlines established in 1999
Airlines disestablished in 2009
1999 establishments in Cameroon